Cigaritis rukma or silver-red silverline is a butterfly in the family Lycaenidae. It was described by Lionel de Niceville in 1889. It is found in the Indomalayan realm (Burma, Thailand, and Laos).

Subspecies
C. r. rukma Sikkim, Bhutan, Thailand
C. r. sophia (D'Abrera, 1993) Yunnan

References

External links
Cigaritis at Markku Savela's Lepidoptera and Some Other Life Forms

Cigaritis
Butterflies described in 1889